Yemişli may refer to the following places in Turkey:

 Yemişli, Gercüş, a village in the district of Gercüş, Batman Province
 Yemişli, Karataş, a village in the district of Karataş, Adana Province
 Yemişli, Midyat, a village in the district of Midyat, Mardin Province